Michal Rozsíval (born 3 September 1978) is a Czech former professional ice hockey defenceman. He last played for the Chicago Blackhawks of the National Hockey League (NHL). He joined the team in 2012, previously playing for the Pittsburgh Penguins from 1999 until 2004, the New York Rangers from 2005 to 2011, and the Phoenix Coyotes in 2011–12. He is a two time Stanley Cup winner with the Blackhawks in 2013 and 2015.

Playing career

Rozsíval was drafted in the fourth round, 105th overall, by the Pittsburgh Penguins in the 1996 NHL Entry Draft. To adjust to North American play, he moved to Canada to play junior hockey with the Swift Current Broncos of the Western Hockey League (WHL). Before making his debut with the Penguins, he played for the Syracuse Crunch in the American Hockey League (AHL). He made his NHL debut in the 1999–2000 season.

Rozsíval joined the New York Rangers after the 2004–05 NHL lockout as a free agent. On 29 April 2007, Rozsíval ended the Rangers' longest home playoff game since 1971 by scoring on Buffalo Sabres goaltender Ryan Miller at 16:43 of the second overtime period. In the 2007–08 season, Rozsíval led all defensemen in shorthanded goals, with two.

On 1 July 2008, Rozsíval signed a four-year contract extension with the Rangers worth a total of $20 million. On 22 February 2009, Rozsíval switched his jersey number to 33 when former Rangers' player Harry Howell had his number 3 retired.

On 10 January 2011, Rozsíval was traded to the Phoenix Coyotes for Wojtek Wolski. He did not record any points during the Coyotes' run to the 2012 Western Conference Finals against the Los Angeles Kings. He was injured on a play just seconds before Dustin Penner's overtime series winner after a hit from Dustin Brown, and had to be assisted off the ice. On 11 September 2012, Rozsíval was signed as a free agent by the Chicago Blackhawks on a one-year contract. The Blackhawks would win the Stanley Cup during the lockout-shortened 2012–13 season, defeating the Boston Bruins 3–2 in Game 6. In Game 1 of that series, Rozsíval shot a puck that deflected off Dave Bolland and Andrew Shaw into the net for the game-winning triple-overtime goal. Rozsíval was credited with an assist. On 5 July 2013, Rozsíval signed a two-year contract extension to remain with the Blackhawks.

Rozsíval recorded one goal and twelve assists over 65 games during the 2014–15 NHL season. He appeared in ten games during the 2015 Stanley Cup Playoffs, but sustained a critical ankle injury during the Blackhawks’ second round series against the Minnesota Wild. The injury required surgery and between 12 and 16 weeks of rehabilitation. The Blackhawks won the Stanley Cup that year and Rozsíval’s name was engraved on the cup for a second time.

On 22 September 2015, Rozsíval signed a one-year contract extension with the Blackhawks. He made his 2015–16 debut for the Blackhawks on 14 November.  In March 2016,  the Professional Hockey Writers Association nominated Rozsival for the NHL's Masterton Trophy, which is awarded annually to the player who 'best exemplifies the qualities of perseverance, sportsmanship and dedication to ice hockey.'

At the end of the 2015–16 season, Rozsival signed another one-year contract extension with the Blackhawks. On 28 February 2017, Chicago agreed to extend Rozsival's contract through the 2017–2018 season. In the Blackhawks’ penultimate 2016–17 regular season game, Nick Ritchie of the Anaheim Ducks punched Rozsíval in the face as retaliation for a cross-check he delivered to Corey Perry. Rozsíval suffered a facial fracture that required surgical repairs. The NHL suspended Ritchie for two games (one regular season and one playoff game) on the basis that Ritchie's punch was unexpected and Rozsíval was not prepared to fight or defend himself. Rozsíval missed the Blackhawks 2016–17 finale and the entire 2017 playoffs due to the injury. He was later diagnosed with post-concussion symptoms and was placed on the Blackhawks long-term disabled list before the 2017–18 NHL season. He never played an NHL game again.

Career statistics

Regular season and playoffs

International

Awards and honours

Personal life
Rozsival and his wife Jana have two sons: Daniel (who currently plays for the Chicago Mission u16 team) and Dominick.

References

External links
 

1978 births
Living people
Chicago Blackhawks players
Czech ice hockey defencemen
HC Oceláři Třinec players
HC Dynamo Pardubice players
New York Rangers players
Olympic ice hockey players of the Czech Republic
Ice hockey players at the 2014 Winter Olympics
People from Vlašim
Phoenix Coyotes players
Pittsburgh Penguins draft picks
Pittsburgh Penguins players
Stanley Cup champions
Swift Current Broncos players
Syracuse Crunch players
Wilkes-Barre/Scranton Penguins players
Sportspeople from the Central Bohemian Region
Czech expatriate ice hockey players in Canada
Czech expatriate ice hockey players in the United States